The climate of Miami is classified as having a tropical monsoon climate with hot and humid summers; short, warm winters; and a marked drier season in the winter. Its sea-level elevation, coastal location, position just above the Tropic of Cancer, and proximity to the Gulf Stream shape its climate.

With January averaging , winter features warm temperatures; cool air usually settles after the passage of a cold front, which produces much of the little amount of rainfall. Lows sometimes fall to or below , with an average 3 such occurrences annually, but rarely ; from 1981 to 2010, temperatures reached that level in only eight calendar years. Highs generally reach  or higher, and fail to do so on only an average of 12 days annually.The wet season usually begins during the month of May and continues through mid-October. During this period, temperatures are in the mid 80s to low 90s (29–35 °C), accompanied by high humidity, though the heat is often relieved by afternoon thunderstorms or a sea breeze that develops off the Atlantic Ocean, which then allow lower temperatures, but conditions still remain very muggy. Much of the year's  of rainfall occurs during this period.
Extreme temperatures range from 27 F on February 3, 1917, to 100 °F on July 21, 1942, (−2.8 to 38 °C), the only triple-digit (°F) reading on record; the more recent freezing temperature seen at Miami International Airport was on December 25, 1989.

While Miami has never officially recorded any accumulating snowfall since records have been kept, there were non-accumulating snow flurries in some parts of the city on January 19, 1977 during the cold wave of January 1977. Weather conditions for the area around Miami were recorded sporadically from 1839 until 1900, with many years-long gaps. A cooperative temperature and rainfall recording site was established in December 1900 in what is now Downtown Miami. An official Weather Bureau Office opened in Miami in June 1911. A record setting 12-day cold snap in January 2010 was the coldest period since at least the 1940s.

Miami receives abundant rainfall, one of the highest among major cities in the United States. Most of this rainfall occurs from mid-May through early October.

Miami reports more thunderstorms than most US cities, with about eighty days per year having thunder reported. These storms are often strong, with frequent lightning and very heavy rain. Occasionally, they can be severe with damaging straight line winds and large hail. Tornadoes and waterspouts sometimes occur, although violent tornadoes of the type seen in other parts of the United States are rare in Florida.

During El Niño events, Miami becomes cooler than normal during the dry season with above average precipitation. During La Niña, Miami becomes warmer and drier than normal.

While the climate for much of the state is humid subtropical, South Florida qualifies as one of several tropical classifications (Köppen Aw, As, Am, or Af). With global warming, the urban heat island effect, as well as Biscayne Bay as a buffer, the waterside downtown area and the barrier islands including Miami Beach made it into hardiness zone 11a by 2012. Miami Beach has virtually no freezing weather in its history and few instances of sub- weather.

Data

This chart shows the average coastal ocean water temperature by month in degrees Fahrenheit for Miami Beach based on historical measurements.

Hurricanes

The Atlantic hurricane season  officially runs from June 1 through November 30, although hurricanes can develop beyond those dates. The most likely time for Miami to be hit is during the peak of the Cape Verde season which is mid-August through the end of September. Due to its location between two major bodies of water known for tropical activity, Miami is also statistically the most likely major city in the world to be struck by a hurricane, trailed closely by Nassau, Bahamas, and Havana, Cuba. Despite this, the city has been fortunate in not having a direct hit by a hurricane since Hurricane Cleo in 1964. 

Miami has been identified as one of three cities in the United States most vulnerable to hurricanes, mainly due to its location and it being surrounded by ocean and low-lying coastal plains, the other two cities being New Orleans and Houston.

See also
Climate of Florida
Climate change in Florida

Notes

References

Miami
Climate of Florida